This is a list of the heritage sites in Mpumalanga as recognized by the South African Heritage Resources Agency.

|}

References 

Tourist attractions in Mpumalanga
Mpumalanga
Heritage sites
Lime kilns in South Africa